Oliver Paasch (Malmedy, 21 October 1971) is a Belgian politician of the German-speaking Pro Deutschsprachige Gemeinschaft party and the incumbent Minister-president of the German-speaking Community of Belgium.

Between 2004 and 2014 he held several ministerial posts in the Government of the German-language Community. In June 2014 he replaced Karl-Heinz Lambertz as Minister-President of the German-speaking Community.

References

1971 births
Living people
Ministers-President of the German-speaking Community in Belgium
People from Malmedy